Marcello Siboni (born 6 January 1965) is an Italian former racing cyclist. He rode in five editions of the Tour de France and seven editions of the Giro d'Italia.

Major results

1986
 1st GP Capodarco
1987
 5th Trofeo Matteotti
 10th GP Industria & Artigianato
1988
 10th Trofeo Pantalica
1989
 7th Giro di Lombardia
1990
 4th Gran Premio Città di Camaiore
1997
 8th À travers Lausanne
1999
 3rd Giro dell'Emilia
 6th Criterium d'Abruzzo
 8th Giro del Lazio
 8th Gran Premio Bruno Beghelli
 9th Giro del Veneto
 9th GP Llodio
2000
 8th Gran Premio Città di Camaiore

Grand Tour general classification results timeline

References

External links

1965 births
Living people
Italian male cyclists
People from Cesena
Cyclists from Emilia-Romagna
Sportspeople from the Province of Forlì-Cesena